Andrés Pío Bernardino Chadwick Piñera (born 2 January 1956) is a Chilean right-wing politician and lawyer, member of the Independent Democrat Union (UDI) party. He began his political career as a supporter of the Pinochet dictatorship, and was present at the Acto de Chacarillas in 1977. Chadwick was elected deputy for the District #33 in 1989, and was re-elected in 1993. In 1997, he was elected senator for the 9th Circumscription of the VI Región del Libertador General Bernardo O'Higgins, and was re-elected in 2005 again. On 18 July 2011 he was invited by his cousin, President Sebastián Piñera, to become Minister Secretary General of Government. He was later appointed Interior Minister on 5 November 2012 and his term ended on 11 March 2014.

He joined the second government of Piñera on 11 March 2018 as Interior and Public Security Minister and held that position until 28 October 2019. On 11 December Chadwick was impeached for his role in the 2019–2020 Chilean protests, including the large number of eye injuries attained by protesters. Chadwick is effectively banned to hold public office for five years (until 2024).

Biography
Andrés Chadwick was born on 2 January 1956. His parents were Herman Chadwick Valdés and Paulette Piñera Carvallo (sister of Bernardino Piñera). Chadwick is currently married to María Victoria Costa, with whom he has four children. He is also first cousin of President Sebastián Piñera.

Chadwick was a vocal supporter of Pinochet dictatorship, which had previously appointed him president of the Catholic University Students Federation. In 2012 Chadwick expressed "deep repentance" for this support after discovering "over the years" serious human rights violations committed by the dictatorship, while defending the regime on other grounds.

Studies
He completed his primary and secondary studies in Colegio Verbo Divino in Santiago. Chadwick joined afterwards the Law Faculty in the Pontifical Catholic University of Chile.

Political career
Chadwick was appointed president of the Students Federation of the Catholic University of Chile (FEUC) by the military regime, and later graduated as a lawyer from the Pontifical Catholic University of Chile, later working as a professor. In the 1980s, Chadwick holds office in several political charges, such as in the Youth sections of the Independent Democrat Union Movement, National Unity, and National Renewal.

He was a member of the Chamber of Deputies of Chile between 1990 and 1998, and has been, since 1998, member of the Senate of Chile, representing the ninth O'Higgins circumscription.

Electoral history

Parliamentary election, 1989

Deputy for the District #33 of the communes of Mostazal, Graneros, Codegua, Machalí, Requínoa, Rengo, Olivar, Doñihue, Coínco, Coltauco, Quinta de Tilcoco, and Malloa, in the VI Región del Libertador General Bernardo O'Higgins.

Parliamentary election, 1993
Deputy for the District #33 of the communes of Mostazal, Graneros, Codegua, Machalí, Requínoa, Rengo, Olivar, Doñihue, Coínco, Coltauco, Quinta de Tilcoco, and Malloa, in the VI Región del Libertador General Bernardo O'Higgins.

Parliamentary election, 1997
Senators for the 9th Circunscription of the VI O'Higgins Region.

Parliamentary election, 2005
Senators for the 9th Circunscription, VI O'Higgins Region.

References

External links

 Andrés Chadwick's official website 
 Parliamentary Infobox in the Senate of Chile
 Biographical information at the Library of the National Congress of Chile

|-

1956 births
Living people
Pontifical Catholic University of Chile alumni
Members of the Chamber of Deputies of Chile
Piñera family
Independent Democratic Union politicians
Politicians from Santiago
Members of the Senate of Chile
Colegio del Verbo Divino alumni
Presidents of the Pontifical Catholic University of Chile Student Federation
Chilean Ministers of the Interior
20th-century Chilean lawyers
Impeached officials removed from office
21st-century Chilean lawyers
Chilean Ministers Secretary General of Government
Impeached Chilean officials